The 1948 New York Yankees season was the team's 46th season. The team finished with a record of 94–60, finishing 2.5 games behind the Cleveland Indians and 1.5 games behind the second-place Boston Red Sox. New York was managed by Bucky Harris. The Yankees played their home games at Yankee Stadium.

The fractional games-behind came about due to the frenzied pennant race, which saw the Yankees, Red Sox and Indians all battling it out to the end. The Yankees fell just a little short, and the Red Sox and Indians finished in a tie for first at 96–58. They held a one-game playoff, which counted as part of the regular season, so the Indians' victory raised their record to 97–58, and dropped the Red Sox to 96–59.

The Yankees did not renew Bucky Harris' contract after the season, opting instead to hire Casey Stengel starting in 1949. This move raised some eyebrows, but Stengel had just led the Oakland Oaks to the Pacific Coast League pennant in 1948, demonstrating that with good talent, he had a good chance to succeed. The Yankees were about to begin the most dominating stretch of their long dynasty.

Babe Ruth's death 

On July 26, 1948, Babe Ruth attended the premiere of the film The Babe Ruth Story, a biopic about his life. William Bendix portrayed Ruth.  Shortly thereafter, Ruth returned to the hospital for the final time. He was barely able to speak. Ruth's condition gradually became worse, and in his last days, scores of reporters and photographers hovered around the hospital. Only a few visitors were allowed to see him, one of whom was National League president and future Commissioner of Baseball, Ford Frick. "Ruth was so thin it was unbelievable. He had been such a big man and his arms were just skinny little bones, and his face was so haggard," Frick said years later.

On August 16, the day after Frick's visit, Babe Ruth died at age 53.  His body lay in repose in Yankee Stadium. His funeral was two days later at St. Patrick's Cathedral, New York. Ruth was then buried in the Cemetery of the Gate of Heaven in Hawthorne, New York.

At his death, the New York Times called Babe Ruth, "a figure unprecedented in American life. A born showman off the field and a marvelous performer on it, he had an amazing flair for doing the spectacular at the most dramatic moment."

Offseason 
 February 24, 1948: Bill Wight, Fred Bradley, and Aaron Robinson were traded by the Yankees to the Chicago White Sox for Eddie Lopat.
 Prior to 1948 season: Al Cicotte and Gus Triandos were signed as an amateur free agents by the Yankees.

Regular season

Season standings

Record vs. opponents

Roster

Player stats

Batting

Starters by position 
Note: Pos = Position; G = Games played; AB = At bats; H = Hits; Avg. = Batting average; HR = Home runs; RBI = Runs batted in

Other batters 
Note: G = Games played; AB = At bats; H = Hits; Avg. = Batting average; HR = Home runs; RBI = Runs batted in

Pitching

Starting pitchers 
Note: G = Games pitched; IP = Innings pitched; W = Wins; L = Losses; ERA = Earned run average; SO = Strikeouts

Other pitchers 
Note: G = Games pitched; IP = Innings pitched; W = Wins; L = Losses; ERA = Earned run average; SO = Strikeouts

Relief pitchers 
Note: G = Games pitched; IP = Innings pitched; W = Wins; L = Losses; SV = Saves; ERA = Earned run average; SO = Strikeouts

Farm system 

LEAGUE CHAMPIONS: Grand Forks, Twin Falls, Independence, Blackstone

Notes

References 
1948 New York Yankees at Baseball Reference
1948 New York Yankees team page at www.baseball-almanac.com

New York Yankees seasons
New York Yankees
New York Yankees
1940s in the Bronx